Oxycerini is a tribe of flies in the family Stratiomyidae.

Genera
Caloparyphus James, 1939
Euparyphus Gerstaecker, 1857
Oxycera Meigen, 1803
Oxycerina Rozkošný & Woodley, 2010
Vanoyia Villeneuve, 1908

References 

Stratiomyidae
Brachycera tribes